Frank Heaney (23 November 1886 – 24 August 1937) was an Irish amateur footballer who played in the Football League for Leeds City as a right back. He was a member of the Irish Free State squad for the 1924 Summer OIympics, but did not travel to the tournament.

Personal life 
Heaney's brother John also became a footballer. He served in the Irish Guards during the First World War and died of stomach cancer in 1937.

Career statistics

Honours 
St James's Gate

 League of Ireland (1): 1921–22
 FAI Cup (1): 1921–22
 Irish Intermediate Cup (1): 1919–20
 Leinster Senior League (1): 1919–20
 Leinster Senior Cup (2): 1919–20, 1921–22
 LFA Metropolitan Cup (1): 1919–20

References

Irish association footballers (before 1923)
NIFL Premiership players
Association football fullbacks
St James's Gate F.C. players
English Football League players
Leeds City F.C. players
Northern Ireland amateur international footballers
Shelbourne F.C. players
Association footballers from Dublin (city)
1886 births
1937 deaths
British Army personnel of World War I
Irish Guards soldiers
Deaths from stomach cancer
Olympic footballers of Ireland
Footballers at the 1924 Summer Olympics
Deaths from cancer in the Republic of Ireland